USS Abner Read (DD-769) was a planned United States Navy  laid down during World War II but never completed. The ship was to be the second ship named for Abner Read (1821–1863), a United States Navy officer killed during the American Civil War.

Construction 
Abner Read was laid down by the Bethlehem Shipbuilding Corporation at San Francisco, California on 21 May 1944. The end of World War II in August 1945 resulted in the termination of the contract for her construction on 12 September 1946 or 13 September 1946. She was stricken from the Naval Vessel Register on 13 September 1946 and scrapped on the building ways. Scrapping was completed in January 1947.

Notes

References

Online sources

External links

World War II destroyers of the United States
Ships built in San Francisco
Cancelled ships of the United States Navy
1946 ships
Gearing-class destroyers of the United States Navy